The 1993 UNCAF Nations Cup was the second edition of the UNCAF Nations Cup, the football championship of Unión Centroamericana de Fútbol (UNCAF).

Preliminary round

Squads

For a complete list of all participating squads see 1993 UNCAF Nations Cup squads

Stadium

Group stage

All matches were played in Tegucigalpa, Honduras

Champions

Honduras, Costa Rica, and Panama qualified automatically for 1993 CONCACAF Gold Cup.

Top scorers
5 goals
 Nicolas Suazo
3 goals
 Rónald Gómez
2 goals
 Javier Astúa
 Germán Rodríguez

Best XI of the Tournament

References

External links

 
Nations
Copa Centroamericana
International association football competitions hosted by Honduras
Nations